Praveen Tej is an Indian  film and television actor, known for his works in Kannada. Praveen made his feature film debut in Kannada film industry with Jolly Days (2009). He is known for his performance in   Simpallag Innondh Love Story (2016) and Mundina Nildana (2019).

Early life 
Praveen Tej was born on 3 December 1984 in Hosanagara, Shimoga district to Lakshmana Gowda and Padmavathi.

Career 
He made his debut in the Kannada film industry with movie Jolly Days (2009), where he played one of the lead roles, Praveena. He was later part of a Kannada reality show aired on Suvarna TV, Pyate Mandi Kadige Bandru (2011).

He acted television series, Radha Kalyana (2012) was aired Zee Kannada.

Praveen later starred in film Aantharya as Krishna (2013) directed by Anney Santhosh Gowda. He played the role of Kush in the film Simpallag Innondh Love Story (2016), a sequel of Kannada hit Simple Agi Ondh Love Story. His other films 5G (2017), Kuchiku Kuchiku (2018).

His next movie was the crime thriller Churikatte in 2018.
He acted in the film Striker (2019). His next movie, Mundina Nildana (2019) was a hit.

Personal life 
Praveen married Deepika Nazre in 2014 and has a son.

Filmography

Television

References 

1984 births
Living people
Indian male television actors
Indian male film actors
21st-century Indian male actors
People from Shimoga district
Actors in Kannada cinema
Male actors in Kannada television